Markus Ebner (born 9 November 1970) is a German former snowboarder. He competed at the 2002 Winter Olympics and the 2006 Winter Olympics.

References

External links
 

1970 births
Living people
German male snowboarders
Olympic snowboarders of Germany
Snowboarders at the 2002 Winter Olympics
Snowboarders at the 2006 Winter Olympics
Sportspeople from Ingolstadt
21st-century German people